is an arcade racing simulation video game released by Namco in 1982 and licensed to Atari, Inc. for US manufacture and distribution, running on the Namco Pole Position arcade system board. It is considered one of the most important titles from the golden age of arcade video games. Pole Position was an evolution of Namco's earlier arcade racing electro-mechanical games, notably F-1 (1976), whose designer Sho Osugi worked on the development of Pole Position.

The game was a major commercial success in arcades. After becoming the highest-grossing arcade game of 1982 in Japan, it went on to become the most popular coin-operated arcade game internationally in 1983. In North America, it was the highest-grossing arcade game for two years in 1983 and 1984 and still one of the top five arcade video games of 1985.

It was the most successful racing game of the classic era, spawning ports, sequels, and a Saturday morning cartoon, although the cartoon had very little in common with the game. The game established the conventions of the racing game genre and its success inspired numerous imitators. Pole Position is regarded as one of the most influential video games of all time, and it is considered to be the most influential racing game in particular. Its sequel, Pole Position II, was released in 1983.

Gameplay

In this game, the player controls a Formula One race car and has to complete a time trial lap within a certain amount of time (between 57 and 120 seconds) to qualify for an F1 race at the Fuji Racetrack. After qualifying, the player races against seven other CPU-controlled cars in a championship race (but if they do not qualify, the car will stay on the track until the timer runs out). The player must also avoid going off the road so that they will not crash into the billboards. Play continues until either time runs out in any lap and/or complete four laps of the race, which ends the game.

Pole Position was the first racing video game to feature a track based on a real racing circuit. It was also the first game to feature a qualifying lap, requiring the player to complete a time trial before they can compete in Grand Prix races. Once the player has qualified, they must complete the race in the time allowed, avoiding collisions with CPU-controlled opponents and billboards along the sides of the track. The game's publisher, Atari, publicized the game for its "unbelievable driving realism" in providing a Formula 1 experience behind a racing wheel. The game's graphics featured full-colour landscapes with scaling sprites, including race cars and other signs, and a pseudo-3D, third-person, rear perspective view of the track, with its vanishing point swaying side to side as the player approaches corners, accurately simulating forward movement into the distance. While earlier three-dimensional arcade driving games emphasized staying on the road while avoiding crashes, Pole Position gives a higher reward for passing rival cars and finishing among the leaders.

Cabinet
Pole Position was released in two configurations: a standard upright cabinet and an environmental/cockpit cabinet. Both versions feature a steering wheel and a gear shifter for low and high gears, but the environmental/cockpit cabinet featured both an accelerator and a brake pedal, while the standard upright one only featured an accelerator pedal.

Development

Pole Position was created by both Shinichiro Okamoto and Galaxian designer Kazunori Sawano. Namco electro-mechanical game engineer Sho Osugi also assisted with development. Based on Namco's experience with producing coin-operated electro-mechanical driving games in the 1970s, notably F-1 (1976) designed by Sho Osugi, Sawano showed Okamoto rough sketches of his idea, who liked the idea and began production of a video racing game. Okamoto wanted the game to be a true driving simulation game that used a 3D perspective and allowed the player to execute real-world techniques. He also chose to add the Fuji Speedway into the game to make newer players recognize it when they first played. Music was jointly composed by Nobuyuki Ohnogi and Yuriko Keino.

Development of the game lasted for three years. Okamoto recalls the most challenging part of development being to produce the hardware needed to run it, as the game was too "ambitious" to run on older hardware. The development team used two 16-bit processors to power the game, which Okamoto says was an unheard-of concept for arcade games at the time — for a while, it was the only video game to use a Z8000 CPU. Pac-Man creator Toru Iwatani chose the name Pole Position as he thought it sounded "cool" and appealing, and he shortly after filed a trademark for it. The controls also proved to be a challenge, as Okamoto wanted them to feel realistic and to match up with the gameplay — Osugi remembers Namco president Masaya Nakamura becoming frustrated with them, having difficulty keeping the car moving in a straight line.

The game's arcade cabinet, a sit-down "environmental" machine, was chosen due to their popularity at the time. The development team had long fights over how fast the gear-shift should be, until it was ultimately decided to simply be either high or low speed.

Release
Pole Position was officially released in Japan on September 16, 1982. It was licensed out to Atari, Inc. for release in North America, where it made its debut at Chicago's 1982 Amusement & Music Operators Association (AMOA) show, held during November 18–20, before receiving a mass-market North American release on November 30, 1982, while Namco themselves released the game in Europe in late 1982. After its release, Osugi stated that all of Namco's older electro-mechanical driving games were discontinued, as the company saw the future of arcade racers in the form of video games.

Advertising
The game is an early example of product placement within a video game, with billboards around the track advertising actual companies.

The game was also featured in a TV commercial shown only on MTV. It was part of a series of TV spots that Atari created in the 1980s exclusively for MTV.

Reception

In Japan, Game Machine magazine listed Pole Position as the highest-grossing arcade game of 1982. Game Machine later listed it in their June 1, 1983 issue as the second top-grossing upright arcade unit of the month, before it returned to being the top-grossing game of the month in October 1983. Internationally, Pole Position was the most popular arcade game of 1983. In Europe, it was a top-grossing arcade game in 1983.

In the United States, it sold over 21,000 arcade cabinets for an estimated  ($ adjusted for inflation) by 1983. In addition, US coin drop earnings averaged  ( adjusted for inflation) per week ($450 weekly per machine). On the US RePlay arcade charts, it topped the upright cabinet charts for seven months in 1983, from March through August and again in December. It also topped the US Play Meter arcade charts for six consecutive months from March through August 1983, and then topped the street locations chart in November 1983. It ended the year as the highest-grossing arcade game of 1983 in North America, according to RePlay and the Amusement & Music Operators Association (AMOA), and again became the highest-grossing arcade game of 1984 in the United States. Several years after its release, it was still one of the top five highest-grossing arcade video games of 1985.

The console version topped the UK sales charts in late 1983.

Reviews
Upon its North American debut at AMOA 1982, it was reviewed by Video Games magazine, which listed it among the show's top ten games. They compared it favorably with Sega's Turbo (1981), referring to Pole Position as "Turbo Deluxe" in "a speedway, not a cross-country race." They called Pole Position the "ultimate test of driving skill for only the very best video game roadstars." Electronic Games reviewed the arcade game in 1983, writing that it "keeps the action on track from start to finish" with "challenging play", noting that the gameplay is "reasonably faithful to real life" Formula One races. They also praised the sound effects and "solid, realistic graphics", stating it has "very rich color images" and "dimensional depth to the graphics". They gave it the 1983 Arcade Award for Coin-Op Game of the Year, praising the racing gameplay, "beautiful graphics" and "breathtaking" scenery as well as "the two-heat format for the race itself".

Computer and Video Games reviewed the arcade game in 1983, writing that it "is simply the most exhilarating driving simulation game on the market". They compared it favorably with Turbo, stating that, while Turbo "featured better landscapes", it "can't match the speed, thrills and skill behind this new race game". They said Pole Positions "graphics are sophisticated and believable", noting that cars "turning corners are shown in every graphic detail of the maneuvre", and praised the gameplay, concluding that "trying to hold a screaming curve or overtake" offers "thrills to compare with the real racetrack". It was considered the all-time best racing/driving game by InfoWorld in 1983 and Computer Games in early 1985.

When reviewing the Atari 8-bit version, InfoWorld called it "by far the best road-race game ever thrown on a video screen" with "bright and brilliant" graphics, but said the Commodore 64 version "looks like a rush job and is far from arcade-game quality". Computer Games magazine criticized the Commodore conversions for lacking various features from the arcade original, giving the C64 version a mixed review and the VIC-20 version a negative review. Computer and Video Games reviewed the Atari 2600 version, stating it is "the best driving game available" on the Atari VCS. When reviewing the Atari 5200 version, Hi-Res in 1984 found "the playability of the game to be limited and the graphics to be the strongest aspect of the game". The magazine preferred Adventure International's Rally Speedway to both Pole Position and Epyx's Pitstop.

In 2007, Eurogamer gave it a mixed retrospective review, calling it "a simulation down to the core: those dedicated will eventually reap success but most will be deterred by the difficulty." Entertainment Weekly called Pole Position one of the top ten games for the Atari 2600 in 2013.

Impact
Pole Position is regarded as one of the most influential video games of all time. Bill Loguce and Matt Barton listed it as one of the 25 most influential games of all time, calling it "arguably the most important racing game ever made". In 1984, Electronic Games stated that, for "the first time in the amusement parlors, a first-person racing game gives a higher reward for passing cars and finishing among the leaders rather than just for keeping all four wheels on the road, thus making driving an art". In 1995, Flux magazine ranked the game 32nd on their "Top 100 Video Games." In 2015, Pole Position topped IGN's list of The Top 10 Most Influential Racing Games Ever. They stated that it had "a drastically better-looking" third-person "chase cam view" than Turbo, was "the first racing game based on a real-world racing circuit (Fuji Speedway in Japan)", "introduced checkpoints, and was the first to require a qualifying lap", and that its success, as "the highest-grossing arcade game in North America in 1983, cemented the genre in place for decades to come and inspired a horde of other racing games".

Legacy

It was the most successful racing game of the classic era, spawning ports, sequels, and a Saturday morning cartoon.

The game spawned a number of clones, such as Top Racer from Commodore International, which led to a lawsuit from Namco against Commodore Japan that led to the seizure of Top Racer copies.

Other media

The title spawned a Saturday morning cartoon of the same name.

Parker Brothers published the Pole Position board game in 1983.

Notes

References

External links
 

1982 video games
arcade video games
Atari 2600 games
Atari 5200 games
Atari 8-bit family games
Atari arcade games
Bandai Namco Entertainment franchises
Commodore 64 games
VIC-20 games
Formula One video games
Namco arcade games
racing video games
single-player video games
TI-99/4A games
Vectrex games
video games developed in Japan
video games scored by Yuriko Keino
Video games adapted into television shows